Josefina Yolanda Pellicer López de Llergo (3 April 1934 – 4 December 1964), known professionally as Pina Pellicer, was a Mexican actress known in her country for portraying the female lead in Macario (1960), and in the United States as Louisa alongside Marlon Brando in the Brando-directed movie One-Eyed Jacks (1961).

Childhood and family 
Josefina Yolanda Pellicer López de Llergo was born on 3 April, 1934, in Mexico City, daughter of César Pellicer Sánchez, a lawyer, and Pilar López de Llergo. Her uncle Carlos Pellicer was a modernist poet. Of her seven siblings, her younger sister Pilar Pellicer also became an actress best known for her roles in numerous telenovelas; another younger sister, Ana, is a sculptor and the co-author of Pina Pellicer's 2006 biography.

Career

Pellicer's first acting role, albeit only her second movie to be released, was the Paramount Pictures production One-Eyed Jacks. In the movie, Pellicer played Louisa, the stepdaughter of Karl Malden and the lover of Marlon Brando. Mexican actress Katy Jurado also appeared as Louisa's mother. The production of the movie was much-delayed, and the original director Stanley Kubrick left along with screenwriter Sam Peckinpah, leaving Brando to finish the movie – the only time Brando was credited with directing a movie. So even though production started in 1958, the movie was not released until 1961. European response was positive, and in July 1961 the movie received the Golden Shell (Concha de Oro) at the San Sebastián International Film Festival. In addition, Pellicer was awarded the prize for best female performer, with reviews comparing her to Audrey Hepburn. In the United States, the response was more mixed and the movie received only one Academy Award nomination, for Charles Lang's cinematography.

The first movie with Pellicer to reach the theaters was the Mexican production Macario, released in 1960. Pellicer played the wife of the title character opposite Ignacio López Tarso. Macario was the first Mexican production to be nominated for the Academy Award for Best Foreign Language Film, but ultimately lost out to Ingmar Bergman's The Virgin Spring. After Macario, Pellicer appeared in two more Mexican films, Días de Otoño, released in 1963, and Sinful, released after her death in 1965. During her appearance at the San Sebastián Film Festival, she met Spanish director Rafael Gil, who cast the actress for the title role in the movie Rogelia, filmed in Asturias and released in 1962. In addition to her movie work, she also appeared in episodes for the television shows The Fugitive ("Smoke Screen", 1963) and The Alfred Hitchcock Hour ("The Life Work of Juan Diaz", 1964; written by Ray Bradbury), as well as on Mexican television.

Death

Pellicer died by suicide on 4 December 1964, aged 30, with an overdose of sleeping pills. Her remains were buried at Panteón Francés in Mexico City.

Filmography

References

Inline citations

General references
 Reynol Pérez Vázquez & Ana Pellicer: Pina Pellicer. Luz de tristeza (1934–1964); México, D.F.: Universidad Nacional Autónoma de México (2006). 
 Juan José Olivares: "Pina Pellicer, mujer adelantada a su época, pero invadida por la tristeza"; La Jornada, 24 April 2007.
 Reynol Pérez Vázquez: "Pina Pellicer: una vida frágil"; Pointcast Media "Los Tubos", 24 April 2007.
 Luis José de Ávila: "Pina, la musa de Marlon Brando"; La Voz de Asturias, 18 February 2006.

External links
 

Actresses from Mexico City
Barbiturates-related deaths
Drug-related suicides in Mexico
Female suicides
Mexican film actresses
Mexican television actresses
People with mood disorders
1934 births
1964 suicides
20th-century Mexican actresses